At least 377 species of butterfly have been recorded in Taiwan, with some reports putting the number at over 400. Of these, 56 species are endemic to the island. Taiwan is in the Indomalayan realm.

Following is a list of all butterflies found in Taiwan.

Family Hesperiidae

Subfamily Coeliadinae 
 Badamia exclamationis (Fabricius, 1775) brown awl
 Bibasis jaina formosana (Fruhstorfer, 1911) - formerly Burara
 Choaspes benjaminii formosanus (Fruhstorfer, 1911) Indian awl king
 Choaspes xanthopogon chrysopterus Hsu, 1988
 Hasora anura taiwana Hsu, Tsukiyama & Chiba, 2005 slate awl
 Hasora badra (Moore, 1858) common awl
 Hasora chromus (Cramer, 1782) banded awl
 Hasora taminatus vairacana Fruhstorfer, 1911 white-banded awl

Subfamily Hesperiinae 
 Aeromachus bandaishanus Murayama & Shimonoya, 1968 ※endemic
 Aeromachus inachus formosana Matsumura, 1931
 Aeromachus matsudai (Murayama, 1943) ※endemic
 Ampittia dioscorides etura (Mabille, 1891) bush hopper
 Ampittia virgata miyakei Shonen Matsumura, 1910 striped bush hopper
 Borbo cinnara (Wallace, 1866) Formosan swift
 Caltoris bromus yanuca (Fruhstorfer, 1911) colon swift
 Caltoris cahira austeni (Moore, 1883) dark swift
 Erionota torus Evans, 1941 banana skipper
 Halpe gamma Evans, 1937
 Isoteinon lamprospilus formosanus Fruhstorfer, 1911 shiny-spotted bob
 Notocrypta curvifascia (C. & R. Felder, 1862) restricted demon
 Notocrypta feisthamelii (Boisduval, 1832)
 N. f. alinkara Fruhstorfer, 1911
 N. f. arisana Sonan, 1930
 Ochlodes bouddha yuchingkinus Matsuyama & Shimonoya, 1963
 Ochlodes formosanus (Matsumura, 1919) ※endemic
 Onryza maga takeuchii (Matsumura, 1929)
 Parnara bada (Moore, 1878) Oriental straight swift
 Parnara guttata (Bremer & Grey, 1852) common straight swift
 Pelopidas agna (Moore, 1866) little branded swift
 Pelopidas conjuncta (Herrich-Schäffer, 1869) conjoined swift
 Pelopidas mathias oberthueri Evans, 1937
 Pelopidas sinensis (Mabille, 1877) small branded swift
 Polytremis eltola tappana (Matsumura, 1919)
 Polytremis kiraizana (Sonan, 1938) ※endemic
 Polytremis lubricans taiwana Matsumura, 1919 contiguous swift ※endemic
 Polytremis theca asahinai Shirozu, 1952
 Polytremis zina taiwana Murayama, 1981
 Potanthus confucius angustatus (Matsumura, 1910) Chinese dart
 Potanthus diffusus Hsu, Tsukiyama & Chiba, 2005
 Potanthus motzui Hsu, Li, & Li, 1990 ※endemic
 Potanthus pava (Fruhstorfer, 1911) yellow band dart
 Potanthus wilemanni (Evans, 1934) ※endemic
 Pseudoborbo bevani (Moore, 1878)
 Suastus gremius (Fabricius, 1798) Indian palm bob
 Telicota bambusae horisha Evans, 1934
 Telicota colon bayashikeii Tsukiyama, Chiba & Fujioka, 1997 pale palm dart
 Telicota ohara formosana Fruhstorfer, 1911 dark palm dart
 Thoressa horishana (Matsumura, 1910) ※endemic
 Udaspes folus (Cramer, 1775) grass demon

Subfamily Pyrginae 
 Abraximorpha davidii ermasis Fruhstorfer, 1914 magpie flat
 Celaenorrhinus chihhsiaoi Hsu, 1990 ※endemic
 Celaenorrhinus horishanus Shirozu, 1960 ※endemic
 Celaenorrhinus kurosawai Shirozu, 1960 ※endemic
 Celaenorrhinus maculosus (C. & R. Felder, 1919)
 Celaenorrhinus osculus major Hsu, 1990
 Celaenorrhinus pulomaya formosanus Fruhstorfer, 1909
 Celaenorrhinus ratna Fruhstorfer, 1908
 Coladenia pinsbukana (Shimonoya & Murayama, 1976) ※endemic
 Daimio tethys niitakana Matsumura, 1907
 Lobocla bifasciata kodairai Sonan, 1936
 Pseudocoladenia dan sadakoe (Sonan & Mitono, 1936)
 Satarupa formosibia Strand, 1927 ※endemic
 Satarupa majasra Fruhstorfer, 1910
 Seseria formosana (Fruhstorfer, 1909) ※endemic
 Tagiades cohaerens Mabille, 1914
 Tagiades trebellius martinus Plotz, 1884

Family Papilionidae

Subfamily Papilioninae

Tribe Leptocircini 

 Graphium agamemnon (Linneaeus, 1758) tailed jay
 Graphium cloanthus kuge (Fruhstorfer, 1908) glassy bluebottle
 Graphium doson postianum (Fruhstorfer, 1908) common jay
 Graphium sarpedon connectens (Fruhstorfer, 1906) common bluebottle
 Pazala eurous asakurae (Matsumura, 1908)
 Graphium mullah Pazala timur chungianum (Murayama, 1961)

Tribe Papilionini 

 Papilio maraho (Shiraki & Sonan, 1934) ※endemic
 Papilio agestor matsumurae (Fruhstorfer, 1909) tawny mime
 Papilio bianor Cramer, 1777 Chinese peacock
 P. b. kotoensis Sonan, 1927
 P. b. thrasymedes Fruhstorfer 1909
 Papilio castor formosanus Rothschild, 1896
 Papilio demoleus Linnaeus, 1758 lime butterfly
 Papilio dialis tatsuta Murayama, 1970 southern Chinese peacock
 Papilio epycides melanoleucus (Ney, 1911)
 Papilio helenus fortunius Fruhstorfer, 1908 red Helen
 Papilio paris hermosanus Rebel, 1906
 Papilio hoppo Matsumura, 1907 ※endemic
 Papilio machaon sylvina Hemming, 1933
 Papilio memnon heronus Fruhstorfer, 1903 great Mormon
 Papilio nephelus chaonulus Fruhstorfer, 1908
 Papilio paris nakaharai Shirozu, 1960 Paris peacock
 Papilio polytes Linnaeus, 1758 common Mormon
 P. p. ledebouria Eschscholtz, 1821 ※vagrant
 P. p. pasikrates Fruhstorfer, 1908
 P. p. polytes Linnaeus, 1758 ※vagrant
 Papilio protenor Cramer, 1775 spangle
 Papilio rumanzovia Eschscholtz, 1821 ※vagrant
 Papilio taiwanus Rothschild, 1898 ※endemic
 Papilio xuthus Linnaeus, 1767 Asian swallowtail

Tribe Troidini 
 Atrophaneura horishana (Matsumura, 1910) ※endemic
 Atrophaneura semperi (C.& R. Felder, 1861) ※vagrant
 Byasa alcinous mansonensis (Fruhstorfer, 1901)
 Byasa impediens febanus (Fruhstorfer, 1908)
 Byasa polyeuctes termessus (Fruhstorfer, 1908)
 Pachliopta aristolochiae interpositus (Fruhstorfer, 1901) common rose
 Troides aeacus formosanus Rothschild, 1899 golden birdwing
 Troides magellanus sonani Matsumura, 1932
 Troides plateni (Staudinger, 1889) ※vagrant

Family Pieridae

Subfamily Coliadinae 
 Catopsilia pomona (Fabricius, 1775) lemon emigrant
 Catopsilia pyranthe (Linnaeus, 1758) mottled emigrant
 Catopsilia scylla cornelia (Fabricius, 1787) ※exotic
 Colias erate formosana Shirozu, 1955
 Eurema alitha esakii Shirozu, 1953
 Eurema andersonii godana (Fruhstorfer, 1910)
 Eurema blanda arsakia (Fruhstorfer, 1910) three-spot grass yellow
 Eurema brigitta hainana (Moore, 1878) small grass yellow
 Eurema hecabe (Linnaeus, 1758) common grass yellow
 Eurema laeta punctissima (Matsumura, 1909) spotless grass yellow
 Gonepteryx amintha formosana (Fruhstorfer, 1908)
 Gonepteryx taiwana Paravicini, 1913 ※endemic

Subfamily Pierinae 

 Aporia agathon moltrechti (Oberthür, 1909)
 Aporia gigantea cheni Hsu & Chou, 1999
 Aporia potanini insularis Shirozu, 1959
 Appias albina semperi (Moore, 1905) common albatross
 Appias indra aristoxemus Fruhstorfer, 1908
 Appias lyncida formosana (Wallace, 1866) chocolate albatross
 Appias nero domitia (C. & R. Felder, 1862) ※vagrant
 Appias olferna peducaea Fruhstorfer, 1910 ※vagrant
 Appias paulina minato (Fruhstorfer, 1898)
 Cepora aspasia olga (Eschscholtz, 1821) ※exotic
 Cepora coronis cibyra (Fruhstorfer, 1910) common gullwing
 Cepora nandina eunama (Fruhstorfer, 1903)
 Delias berinda wilemani Jordan, 1925
 Delias hyparete luzonensis C. & R. Felder, 1862 painted Jezebel
 Delias lativitta formosana Matsumura, 1909
 Delias pasithoe curasena Fruhstorfer, 1908 red-base Jezebel
 Hebomoia glaucippe formosana Fruhstorfer, 1908 great orange tip
 Ixias pyrene insignis Butler, 1879 yellow orange tip
 Leptosia nina niobe (Wallace, 1866)
 Pieris canidia (Sparrman, 1768) Indian cabbage white
 Pieris rapae crucivora Boisduval, 1836 cabbage white
 Prioneris thestylis formosana Fruhstorfer, 1908 spotted sawtooth
 Saletara panda nathalia (C. & R. Felder, 1862) ※vagrant
 Talbotia naganum karumii (Ikeda, 1937) Naga white

Family Riodinidae 
 Abisara burnii etymander (Fruhstorfer, 1908)
 Dodona eugenes (Guerin, 1843)
 D. e. esakii Shirozu, 1952
 D. e. formosana Matsumura, 1919

Family Lycaenidae

Subfamily Curetinae 
 Curetis acuta formosana Fruhstorfer, 1908
 Curetis brunnea Wileman, 1909 ※endemic

Subfamily Lycaeninae 

 Heliophorus ila matsumurae (Fruhstorfer, 1908)

Subfamily Miletinae

Tribe Spalgini 
 Spalgis epeus dilama (Moore, 1878)

Tribe Tarakini 
 Taraka hamada thalaba Fruhstorfer, 1922

Subfamily Polyommatinae

Tribe Polyommatini 

 Acytolepis puspa myla (Fruhstorfer, 1909)
 Callenya melaena shonen (Esaki, 1932)
 Catochrysops panormus exiguus (Distant, 1886)
 Catochrysops strabo luzonensis Tite, 1959
 Catopyrops ancyra almora (Druce, 1873) ※exotic
 Celastrina argiolus caphis (Fruhstorfer, 1922)
 Celastrina lavendularis himilcon (Fruhstorfer, 1909)
 Celastrina oreas arisana (Matsumura, 1910)
 Celastrina sugitanii shirozui Hsu, 1987
 Celatoxia marginata (de Niceville, 1884)
 Chilades lajus koshunensis Matsumura, 1919
 Danis schaeffera (Eschscholtz, 1821) ※vagrant
 Euchrysops cnejus (Fabricius, 1798)
 Everes argiades hellotia (Menetries, 1857)
 Everes lacturnus rileyi Godfrey, 1916
 Famegana alsulus taiwana (Sonan, 1938) ※extinct
 Freyeria putli formosanus (Matsumura, 1919)
 Jamides alecto dromicus Fruhstorfer, 1910
 Jamides bochus formosanus Fruhstorfer, 1909
 Jamides celeno (Cramer, 1775)
 Lampides boeticus (Linnaeus, 1767)
 Luthrodes peripatria (Hsu, 1989)
 Megisba malaya sikkima Moore, 1884
 Nacaduba berenice leei Hsu, 1990
 Nacaduba beroe asakusa Fruhstorfer, 1916
 Nacaduba kurava therasia Fruhstorfer, 1916
 Nacaduba pactolus hainani Bethune-Baker, 1914
 Neopithecops zalmora (Butler, 1869)
 Orthomiella rantaizana (Wileman, 1910)
 Phengaris atroguttata formosana (Matsumura, 1926)
 Phengaris daitozana Wileman, 1908 ※endemic
 Pithecops corvus cornix Cowan, 1965
 Pithecops fulgens urai Bethune-Baker, 1913
 Prosotas nora formosana (Fruhstorfer, 1916)
 Shijimia moorei (Leech, 1889)
 Syntarucus plinius (Fabricius, 1793)
 Tongeia filicaudis mushanus (Tanikawa, 1940)
 Tongeia hainani (Bethune-Baker, 1914) ※endemic
 Udara albocaerulea (Moore, 1879)
 Udara dilecta (Moore, 1879)
 Zizeeria karsandra (Moore, 1865)
 Zizeeria maha okinawana (Matsumura, 1929)
 Zizina otis riukuensis (Matsumura, 1929)
 Zizula hylax (Fabricius, 1775)

Subfamily Aphnaeinae 
 Cigaritis kuyaniana (Matsumura, 1919) ※endemic
 Cigaritis lohita formosana (Moore, 1877)
 Cigaritis syama (Horsfield, 1829)

Subfamily Theclinae

Tribe Arhopalini 
 Arhopala bazalus turbata (Butler, 1881)
 Arhopala birmana asakurae (Matsumura, 1910)
 Arhopala ganesa formosana Kato, 1930
 Arhopala japonica (Murray, 1875)
 Arhopala paramuta horishana Matsumura, 1910
 Mahathala ameria hainani Bethune-Baker, 1903

Tribe Catapaecilmatini 
 Catapaecilma major moltrechti (Wileman, 1908)

Tribe Deudorigini 
 Artipe eryx horiella (Matsumura, 1929)
 Deudorix epijarbas menesicles Fruhstorfer, 1911
 Deudorix rapaloides (Naritomi, 1911)
 Deudorix repercussa sankakuhonis Matsumura, 1938
 Rapala caerulea liliacea Nire, 1920
 Rapala nissa hirayamana Matsumura, 1926
 Rapala takasagonis Matsumura, 1929 ※endemic
 Rapala varuna formosana Fruhstorfer, 1911
 Sinthusa chandrana kuyaniana (Matsumura, 1919)

Tribe Eumaeini 
 Fixsenia watarii (Matsumura, 1927) ※endemic
 Satyrium austrinum (Murayama, 1943)
 Satyrium esakii (Shirozu, 1942) ※endemic
 Satyrium eximium mushanum (Matsumura, 1929)
 Satyrium formosanum (Matsumura, 1910)
 Satyrium inouei (Shirozu, 1959)
 Satyrium tanakai (Shirozu, 1943) ※endemic

Tribe Horagini 
 Horaga albimacula triumphalis Murayama & Sibatani, 1943
 Horaga onyx moltrechti Matsumura, 1919
 Horaga rarasana Sonan, 1936 ※endemic

Tribe Hypolycaenini 
 Hypolycaena othona Hewitson, 1865 ※extinct
 Hypolycaena kina inari (Wileman, 1908)

Tribe Iolaini 
 Tajuria caerulea Nire, 1920 ※endemic
 Tajuria diaeus karenkonis Matsumura, 1929
 Tajuria illurgis tattaka (Araki, 1949)

Tribe Remelanini 
 Ancema ctesia cakravasti (Fruhstorfer, 1909)

Tribe Theclini 
 Amblopala avidiena y-fasciata (Sonan, 1929)
 Antigius attilia obsoletus (Takeuchi, 1923)
 Araragi enthea morisonensis (M. Inoue, 1942)
 Chrysozephyrus ataxus lingi Okano & Okura, 1969
 Chrysozephyrus disparatus pseudotaiwanus (Howarth, 1957)
 Chrysozephyrus esakii (Sonan, 1940)
 Chrysozephyrus kabrua niitakanus (Kano, 1928)
 Chrysozephyrus mushaellus (Matsumura, 1938)
 Chrysozephyrus nishikaze (Araki & Sibatani, 1886) ※endemic
 Chrysozephyrus rarasanus (Matsumura, 1939)
 Chrysozephyrus splendidulus Murayama, 1965 ※endemic
 Chrysozephyrus yuchingkinus Murayama & Shimonoya, 1965 ※endemic
 Cordelia comes wilemaniella (Matsumura, 1929)
 Euaspa forsteri (Esaki & Shirozu, 1943)
 Euaspa milionia formosana Nomura, 1931
 Euaspa tayal (Esaki & Shirozu, 1943)
 Iratsume orsedice suzukii (Sonan, 1940)
 Japonica patungkoanui Matsumura, 1956 ※endemic
 Leucantigius atayalicus (Shirozu & Murayama, 1943)
 Neozephyrus taiwanus (Wileman, 1908) ※endemic
 Ravenna nivea (Nire, 1920)
 Sibataniozephyrus kuafui Hsu & Lin, 1994 ※endemic
 Teratozephyrus arisanus (Wileman, 1909)
 Teratozephyrus elatus Hsu & Lu, 2005
 Teratozephyrus yugaii (Kano, 1928) ※endemic
 Ussuriana michaelis takarana (Araki & Hirayama, 1941)
 Wagimo sulgeri insularis (Shirozu, 1957)

Family Nymphalidae

Subfamily Apaturinae 
 Chitoria chrysolora (Fruhstorfer, 1908)
 Chitoria ulupi arakii (Naritomi, 1959)
 Helcyra plesseni (Fruhstorfer, 1912) ※endemic
 Helcyra superba takamukui Matsumura, 1919
 Hestina assimilis formosana (Moore, 1895) red ring skirt
 Sasakia charonda formosana Shirozu, 1963
 Sephisa chandra androdamas Fruhstorfer, 1908 eastern courtier
 Sephisa daimio Matsumura, 1910 ※endemic
 Timelaea albescens formosana Fruhstorfer, 1908

Subfamily Biblidinae 
 Ariadne ariadne pallidior (Fruhstorfer, 1899) angled castor

Subfamily Calinaginae 
 Calinaga buddha formosana Fruhstorfer, 1908

Subfamily Charaxinae 
 Polyura eudamippus formosana (Rothschild, 1899) great nawab
 Polyura narcaea meghaduta (Fruhstorfer, 1908)

Subfamily Cyrestinae 

 Cyrestis thyodamas formosana Fruhstorfer, 1898 common map
 Dichorragia nesimachus formosanus Fruhstorfer, 1909 constable

Subfamily Danainae 

 Danaus chrysippus (Linnaeus, 1758) plain tiger
 Danaus genutia (Cramer, 1779) common tiger
 Danaus melanippus edmondii (Bougainville, 1837) ※vagrant
 Danaus plexippus (Linnaeus, 1758) ※extirpated
 Euploea camaralzeman cratis Butler, 1866 ※vagrant
 Euploea core godartii Lucas, 1853 common Indian crow ※vagrant
 Euploea eunice (Godart, 1819)
 E. e. hobsoni (Butler, 1877)
 E. e. kadu Eschscholtz, 1821 ※vagrant
 Euploea klugii Moore, 1858 ※vagrant
 Euploea mulciber barsine Fruhstorfer, 1904 striped blue crow
 Euploea phaenareta juvia Fruhstorfer, 1908 ※extinct
 Euploea swainson (Godart, 1824) ※vagrant
 Euploea sylvester swinhoei Wallace & Moore, 1866 double-branded black crow
 Euploea tulliolus (Fabricius, 1793)
 E. t. koxinga Fruhstorfer, 1908
 E. t. pollita Erichson, 1834 ※vagrant
 Idea leuconoe Erichson, 1834
 I. l. clara (Butler, 1867)
 I. l. kwashotoensis (Sonan, 1928)
 Ideopsis similis (Linnaeus, 1758) Ceylon blue glassy tiger
 Parantica aglea maghaba (Fruhstorfer, 1909) glassy tiger
 Parantica luzonensis (C. & R. Felder, 1863) ※vagrant
 Parantica sita niphonica (Moore, 1883) chestnut tiger
 Parantica swinhoei (Moore, 1883) Swinhoe's chocolate tiger
 Tirumala hamata orientalis (Semper, 1879) ※vagrant
 Tirumala limniace (Cramer, 1775) blue tiger
 T. l. limniace (Cramer, 1775)
 T. l. orestilla (Fruhstorfer, 1910) ※vagrant
 Tirumala septentrionis (Butler, 1874) dark blue tiger

Subfamily Heliconiinae 
 Acraea issoria formosana (Fruhstorfer, 1912) yellow coster
 Argynnis paphia formosicola Matsumura, 1927
 Argynnis hyperbius (Linnaeus, 1763) Indian fritillary
 Boloria pales yangi Hsu & Yen, 1997 ※extinct
 Cupha erymanthis (Drury, 1773) rustic
 Paduca fasciata (C.& R. Felder, 1860) ※vagrant
 Phalanta phalantha (Drury, 1773) common leopard ※exotic
 Vindula dejone  (Erichson, 1834) ※vagrant

Subfamily Limenitidinae 

 Abrota ganga formosana Fruhstorfer, 1908
 Aldania ilos nirei Nomura, 1935
 Athyma asura baelia (Fruhstorfer, 1908)
 Athyma cama zoroastes (Butler, 1877)
 Athyma fortuna kodahirai (Sonan, 1938)
 Athyma jina sauteri (Fruhstorfer, 1912)
 Athyma opalina hirayamai (Matsumura, 1935)
 Athyma perius (Linnaeus, 1758)
 Athyma selenophora laela (Fruhstorfer, 1908)
 Athyma sulpitia tricula (Fruhstorfer, 1908)
 Euthalia formosana Fruhstorfer, 1908 ※endemic
 Euthalia hebe kosempona Fruhstorfer, 1908
 Euthalia irrubescens fulguralis (Matsumura, 1909)
 Euthalia malapana Shirozu & Chung, 1958 ※endemic
 Euthalia insulae Hall, 1930
 Neptis hesione podarces Nire, 1920
 Neptis hylas luculenta Fruhstorfer, 1907
 Neptis nata lutatia Fruhstorfer, 1913
 Neptis noyala ikedai Shirozu, 1952
 Neptis philyra splendens Murayama, 1942
 Neptis philyroides sonani Murayama, 1942
 Neptis pryeri jucundita Fruhstorfer, 1908
 Neptis reducta Fruhstorfer, 1908 ※endemic
 Neptis sankara shirakiana Matsumura, 1929
 Neptis sappho formosana Fruhstorfer, 1908
 Neptis soma tayalina Murayama & Shimonoya, 1968
 Neptis sylvana esakii Nomura, 1935
 Neptis taiwana Fruhstorfer, 1908 ※endemic
 Pantoporia hordonia rihodona (Moore, 1878)
 Parasarpa dudu jinamitra (Fruhstorfer, 1908)
 Parthenos silvia philippensis Fruhstorfer, 1898

Subfamily Libytheinae 
 Libythea celtis formosana Fruhstorfer, 1909
 Libythea geoffroy philippina Staudinger, 1889 ※vagrant

Subfamily Morphinae 
 Discophora sondaica (Boisduval, 1836) large faun – ※exotic
 Faunis eumeus (Drury, 1773) common duffer ※exotic
 Stichophthalma howqua formosana Fruhstorfer, 1908

Subfamily Nymphalinae 

 Doleschallia bisaltide philippensis Fruhstorfer, 1899 ※vagrant
 Hypolimnas anomala Wallace, 1869 Malayan egg-fly ※exotic
 Hypolimnas bolina (Linnaeus, 1758) great egg-fly
 H. b. jacintha (Drury, 1773) ※exotic
 H. b. kezia (Butler, 1877)
 Hypolimnas misippus (Linnaeus, 1764) Danaid egg-fly
 Junonia almana (Linnaeus, 1758) peacock pansy
 Junonia atlites (Linnaeus, 1758) grey pansy ※exotic
 Junonia hedonia ida (Cramer, 1776) yellow pansy ※vagrant
 Junonia iphita (Cramer, 1779) chocolate pansy
 Junonia lemonias aenaria Tsukada & Kaneko, 1985 lemon pansy
 Junonia orithya (Linnaeus, 1758) blue pansy
 Kallima inachus formosana Fruhstorfer, 1912 orange oakleaf
 Kaniska canace drilon (Fruhstorfer, 1908) blue admiral
 Nymphalis xanthomelas formosana (Matsumura, 1925)
 Polygonia c-album asakurai Nakahara, 1920
 Polygonia c-aureum lunulata Esaki & Nakahara, 1923 comma
 Symbrenthia hypselis scatinia Fruhstorfer, 1908
 Symbrenthia lilaea formosanus Fruhstorfer, 1908 common jester
 Vanessa cardui (Linnaeus, 1758) painted lady
 Vanessa indica (Herbst, 1794) Indian red admiral
 Yoma sabina podium Tsukada, 1985 Australian lurcher

Subfamily Satyrinae 

 Elymnias hypermnestra hainana Moore, 1878 common palmfly
 Lethe bojonia Fruhstorfer, 1913
 Lethe butleri periscelis Fruhstorfer, 1908
 Lethe chandica ratnacri Fruhstorfer, 1908
 Lethe christophi hanako Fruhstorfer, 1908
 Lethe diana australis Naritomi, 1943
 Lethe europa pavida Fruhstorfer, 1908 bamboo treebrown
 Lethe gemina zaitha Fruhstorfer, 1914
 Lethe insana formosana Fruhstorfer, 1908
 Lethe mataja Fruhstorfer, 1908 ※endemic
 Lethe rohria daemoniaca Fruhstorfer, 1908 common tree brown
 Lethe verma cintamani Fruhstorfer, 1848 straight-banded treebrown
 Melanitis leda (Linnaeus, 1758) common evening brown
 Melanitis phedima polishana Fruhstorfer, 1908 dark evening brown
 Minois nagasawae (Matsumura, 1906) ※endemic
 Mycalesis francisca formosana Fruhstorfer, 1908
 Mycalesis gotama nanda Fruhstorfer, 1908
 Mycalesis mineus (Linnaeus, 1758) dark-banded bushbrown
 Mycalesis perseus blasius (Fabricius, 1798) dingy bushbrown
 Mycalesis sangaica mara Fruhstorfer, 1908 single ring bushbrown
 Mycalesis suaveolens kagina Fruhstorfer, 1908
 Mycalesis zonata Matsumura, 1909 South China bushbrown
 Neope armandii lacticolora (Fruhstorfer, 1908)
 Neope bremeri taiwana Matsumura, 1919
 Neope muirheadi nagasawae Matsumura, 1919 Muirhead's labyrinth
 Neope pulaha didia Fruhstorfer, 1909
 Palaeonympha opalina macrophthalmia Fruhstorfer, 1911
 Penthema formosanum (Rothschild, 1898)
 Ypthima akragas Fruhstorfer, 1911 ※endemic
 Ypthima angustipennis Takahashi, 2000 ※endemic
 Ypthima baldus zodina (Fruhstorfer, 1911) common five-ring
 Ypthima conjuncta yamanakai Sonan, 1938
 Ypthima esakii Shirozu, 1960 ※endemic
 Ypthima formosana Fruhstorfer, 1908 ※endemic
 Ypthima motschulskyi (Bremer & Grey, 1853) large three-ring
 Ypthima multistriata Butler, 1883
 Ypthima norma posticalis Matsumura, 1909 small three-ring ※extinct
 Ypthima okurai (Okano, 1962)
 Ypthima praenubilia common four-ring
 Y. p. kanonis Matsumura, 1929
 Y. p. neobilia Murayama, 1980
 Ypthima tappana Matsumura, 1909
 Ypthima wangi Lee, 1998 ※endemic
 Zophoessa dura neoclides (Fruhstorfer, 1909)
 Zophoessa niitakana (Matsumura, 1906) ※endemic
 Zophoessa siderea kanoi (Esaki & Nomura, 1937)

See also
List of moths of Taiwan

References

. 1997. The life histories of Asian butterflies vol. 1. Tokai University Press, Tokyo.
http://booksfromtaiwan.com/Butterfly_Books.html

Taiwan
Taiwan
Lepidoptera of Taiwan
Butterflies of Taiwan
Butterflies